J. Scott Long is a distinguished professor of statistics and sociology at Indiana University Bloomington. Long completed his undergraduate degree at Juniata College in 1973. This was followed by graduate education at Cornell University, where Long finished both his masters in 1973 and Ph.D. in 1977. During his career, he has held appointments at Cornell University and Washington State University before coming to Indiana University in 1989. His career began by studying the dynamics of how doctoral graduates progress through scientific fields using data collected from biochemists. Following this, his research focused on the differences in career outcomes among male and female doctoral graduates, chairing a congressionally mandated committee of the National Academy of Sciences in the process. Over the course of his career, Dr. Long has published over seventy peer reviewed works in the field.

Awards 
Long has been honored throughout his career by a number of different organizations. These include:
 Sociological Research Association, Elected 1989
 Edwin Sutherland Teaching Award, 1996
 Paul F. Lazarsfeld Memorial Award for Distinguished Contributions to Sociological Methodology, 2002
 Georgia Tech Center WST Distinguished Lecturer, 2007/2008
 Freidson Award from the Medical Sociology Section of the American Sociological Association, 2009
 Hurbert M. Blalock Lecture, Interuniversity Consortium of Political and Social Research, 2009
 Key Note Speaker, Valedictory Conference for Jacques Hagenaars, Tilburg University, 2010
 Ellis Lecture, Juniata College, 2010
 Fellow of the American Statistical Association, 2013

References

Year of birth missing (living people)
Living people
American sociologists
Indiana University Bloomington faculty
Cornell University alumni
Juniata College alumni
Fellows of the American Statistical Association